Ghulam Muhammad Ghouse Khan (1824 – 7 October 1855) was the 12th and last Nawab of the Carnatic. He reigned from 1825 to 1855. He belonged to the Second Dynasty.

Early life 

Ghouse Khan was born to the Azam Jah, the eleventh Nawab of the Carnatic in about 1824. His father died when he was one year old. In 1825, Ghouse Khan was proclaimed king with his uncle Azim Jah as regent.

Reign 

In 1825, Ghouse Khan was proclaimed king with Azim Jah as regent. He ruled from 1825 to 1842. Azim Jah served as regent to the young king from 1825 till 1842 when Ghouse Khan was formally installed as the Nawab of the Carnatic by Viceroy Lord Elphinstone.

During his reign, Ghouse Khan established the Muhammadan Public Library in Madras and a choultry called Langar Khana. The Langar Khana now houses the Muslim Widows Association.

Death 

Ghouse Khan died in 1855 at the age of 31. He did not leave behind any male heir. The candidatures of Ghouse Khan's uncle Azim Jah, the only possible successor to the throne were set aside and the kingdom was formally annexed by the British East India Company as per the Doctrine of Lapse.

References 

 

19th-century Indian Muslims
1855 deaths
1824 births
Nawabs of India